The Avre is a river in Picardy, France, and is the principal tributary, from the left side, of the River Somme. At 66 kilometres long, it drains a relatively important basin of 1,150 km² but only flows at best 5,1 m³/s near its confluence at Longueau.
Its principal tributaries are: the Noye, joining at Boves, the Trois Doms joining at Pierrepont-sur-Avre, the Brache joining at Braches and the Luce at Berteaucourt-les-Thennes.

References

Rivers of France
Rivers of Somme (department)
Rivers of Hauts-de-France